PASS is a computer program for estimating sample size or determining the power of a statistical test or confidence interval. NCSS LLC is the company that produces PASS. NCSS LLC also produces NCSS (for statistical analysis).  

PASS includes over 920 documented sample size and power procedures.

Major statistical topics in PASS 

 Means - 1 or 2 Groups
 Means - Correlated or Paired
 Means - Cross-Over Designs
 Means - Many (ANOVA)
 Survival Analysis
 Variances
 ROC Curves
 Equivalence
 Normality Tests
 Confidence Intervals
 Conditional Power
 Proportions - 1 or 2 Groups
 Proportions - Correlated or Paired
 Proportion - Many Groups
 Mixed Models
 Regression/Correlation
 Non-Inferiority 
 Group Sequential Tests
 Design of Experiments

External links
 

Science software